The Haapsalu City Stadium is a multi-purpose stadium in Haapsalu, Estonia. The stadium holds 896 seating places. The address of the stadium is Lihula mnt 10, 90507 Haapsalu.

Background
Although a small stadium, the Haapsalu linnastaadion has hosted some significant matches including: 

2012 UEFA European Under-19 Football Championship - 3 matches 
2012 UEFA Women's U-19 Championship First qualifying round - 3 matches
UEFA Women's Euro 2013 qualifying round - Estonia v Slovakia

Footnotes

External links
ZeroZero

Football venues in Estonia
Buildings and structures in Lääne County
Multi-purpose stadiums in Estonia
Haapsalu
Sport in Haapsalu
Athletics (track and field) venues in Estonia